Cope is an unincorporated town, a post office, and a census-designated place (CDP) located in and governed by Washington County, Colorado, United States. The Cope post office has the ZIP Code 80812. At the United States Census 2010, the population of the 80812 ZIP Code Tabulation Area was 275 including adjacent areas.

History
The Cope post office has been in operation since 1889. The community was named after Johnathon C. Cope, a railroad official.

Geography

Demographics

See also

Outline of Colorado
Index of Colorado-related articles
State of Colorado
Colorado cities and towns
Colorado census designated places
Colorado counties
Washington County, Colorado

References

External links

Washington County website

Unincorporated communities in Washington County, Colorado
Unincorporated communities in Colorado